Heacham Brick Pit is a  geological Site of Special Scientific Interest in Heacham, north of King's Lynn in  Norfolk. It is a Geological Conservation Review site.

This is the only site which gives access to examine the Lower Cretaceous Snettisham Clay. It has Lower Barremian ammonite fossils, dating to around 130 million years ago.

The site is private land with no public access.

References

Sites of Special Scientific Interest in Norfolk
Geological Conservation Review sites
Heacham